The 14th Robert Awards ceremony was held in 1997 in Copenhagen, Denmark. Organized by the Danish Film Academy, the awards honoured the best in Danish and foreign film of 1996.

Honorees

Best Danish Film 
 Breaking the Waves – Lars von Trier

Best Screenplay 
 Lars von Trier – Breaking the Waves

Best Actor in a Leading Role 
 Thomas Bo Larsen – The Biggest Heroes

Best Actress in a Leading Role 
 Emily Watson – Breaking the Waves

Best Actor in a Supporting Role 
 Ulrich Thomsen – The Biggest Heroes

Best Actress in a Supporting Role 
 Katrin Cartlidge – Breaking the Waves

Best Cinematography 
 Robby Müller – Breaking the Waves

Best Production Design 
 Karl Juliusson – Breaking the Waves

Best Costume Design 
 Lotte Dandanell – Hamsun

Best Makeup 
 Jennifer Jorfaid & Sanne Gravfort – Breaking the Waves

Best Sound Design 
 Per Streit – Breaking the Waves

Best Editing 
 Anders Refn – Breaking the Waves

Best Score 
  - The Biggest Heroes

Best Documentary Short 
 Per Kirkeby – Vinterbillede – Jesper Jargil

Best Short Featurette 
 Blomsterfangen – Jens Arentzen

Non-American Film 
 Il Postino: The Postman – Michael Radford

See also 

 1997 Bodil Awards

References

External links 
  

1996 film awards
1997 in Denmark
Robert Awards ceremonies
1990s in Copenhagen